The Zodiac Conspiracy is a supplement published by Hero Games/Iron Crown Enterprises in 1989 for the superhero role-playing game Champions.

Contents
The Zodiac Conspiracy is a supplement describing a group of twelve supervillains known as the Zodiac group, each based on one of the astrological signs. The book also covers details of the supervillains' base, and the operation of their association.

Publication history
The Zodiac Conspiracy is a 48-page saddle-stapled book designed and illustrated by Doug Shuler, with a cover by Neal "Spyder" Hanson, and was published by Hero Games/Iron Crown Enterprises in 1989.

Reviews
White Wolf #24 (Dec./Jan., 1990)
Alarums & Excursions #177 (May 1990, p. 57)

References

Champions (role-playing game) supplements
Role-playing game supplements introduced in 1989